McKinley Township is an inactive township in Polk County, in the U.S. state of Missouri.

McKinley Township was erected in 1910, taking its name from President William McKinley.

References

Townships in Missouri
Townships in Polk County, Missouri